Emotional Backgammon is a 2003 British independent comedy-drama about couples strategizing to repair relationships, with unexpected results. The film was written by Leon Herbert and Matthew Hope, directed by Herbert, and stars Herbert, Wil Johnson, Daniela Lavender, and Jacqueline de Peza.  It is Herbert's first feature-length film. During its development it was featured on UK Channel 4's Movie Virgins series; upon its release, it received mixed reviews.

Plot
John is crushed when his girlfriend, Mary, announces that she's leaving him to "find herself", at the very moment John was about to ask her to marry him.  John seeks out advice from his best friend Steve on strategies to win her back. Steve uses backgammon as a metaphor for approaches to take, telling John to "roll the dice, for love is a game." At the same time, Mary begins taking advice from her best friend, also employing complicated strategies.  It is revealed that both John and Jane share a bitter, complicated past.

Cast
 Leon Herbert as Steve
 Wil Johnson as John
 Daniela Lavender as Mary
 Jacqueline de Peza as Jane
 Bob Mercer as Paul
 Steve Weston as Cab driver
 Steve Edwin as Psychiatrist
 Dee Cannon as Theatre Director

Production
Herbert and Hope stated that, "The script idea was drawn from countless conversations with friends in problematic relationships. It is a story about emotional black-mail, but also an analysis of insecurities, and the charged and complex control tactics we resort to in the game of love."
The film's production was featured on UK Channel 4's series Movie Virgins. With a budget of £6,000, it was shot on location in London, England "in a total of 18 days in July 1999" in 35mm by award-winning cinematographer Koutaiba Al-Janabi.  Soundtrack artists included Kelly Le Roc, Lamarr, Incognito, David Lynden Hall, Fierce and Shola Ama (title track).

Reception
The film was met with very mixed reviews. The BBC review called it neither "a diamond hiding in the rough, or even a half decent feature", referring to the acting as "woeful", the soundtrack "cloyingly overbearing", which "deadens each scene", and the films sexual politics "dubious, unironic, and completely uninterrogated." According to the reviewer, the film's lack of understanding of sexual politics is illustrated by Steve's taking a role in Shakespeare's Taming of the Shrew, and the film is a "clunking, and offensive, drama."

Rich Cline called the film an "enjoyable low-budget British relationship comedy [which] has a serious sting in its tale at the end that almost undoes it altogether." Cline enjoyed the film's "style and substance", "visuals" and acting, but found the plot to be similar to Two Can Play That Game. He appreciated the use of London locations, intercut with "witty fantasy sequences" for character point of view, but found the film to take "seriously disturbing turns" in which misogyny, "rape, murder, and homosexuality" are introduced at the climax of the film, and "seriously weaken the clever and funny film that went before."

Angela Swift wrote that even though she hoped it would succeed, and was prepared to grant considerable latitude for any faults, the film "unfortunately, does not measure up to our hopes or expectations."  Some of the "admirable work" includes the nearly all-black cast, portraying "unabashed ethnicity" and the film's "almost clever" idea with "a few good twists". Swift found the backgammon-human-relationship simile to be overused, though visually interesting: "overkill drowns out any notion of ingenuity", and the film's repeated use of a pun on "Taming of the shrew" to be "without subtlety or insight."  Overall, the film is "relatively unfunny and unsophisticated".

The Time Out reviewer wondered "Are Steve and Jane to blame for what ensues? Or [...] Shakespeare [...]?", and found that, although model/actor Johnson "manages to cut an intriguing figure, the film leaves the viewer perplexed. Is Herbert just playing with his audience?  If so, it's a dangerous game."

According to The Guerrilla Film Maker's Handbook, the film grossed £1056, for 209 tickets sold.

References

External links
 
 
 . Simeon Brody, 2000. New Producer, New Producers Alliance.

2003 films
2003 comedy-drama films
Black British films
British independent films
British comedy-drama films
2003 independent films
2000s English-language films
2000s British films
Backgammon
Films about games
English-language comedy-drama films